The 1945 Campeonato Argentino de Rugby  was won by the selection of Provincia (Buenos Aires Province) that beat in the final the selection of Capital (Buenos Aires city).
Thi first edition was arranged by River Plate Rugby Union with the goal to develop and improve the rugby outside Buenos Aires territory.
Were invited to participate: 
 the selection of Capital, ossia di Buenos Aires
 the selection of Provincia
 the selection of Unión de Rugby del Norte (Tucumán), 
 The San Martín Rugby Club de Villa María from Cordoba Province
 The Litoral (Combinado de Rosario y Santa Fe)
 Montevideo Cricket Club, (club from Uruguay, traditionally connected with Argentine rugby since 1875)
 C. A. Estudiantes de Paraná
 Unión Cordobesa de Rugby.

The tournament were played with knock-out formula

Rugby Union in Argentina in 1945
 The "Buenos Aires Championship" was won by Club Universitario de Buenos Aires
 The "Cordoba Province Championship" was won by Universitario Córdoba
 The North-East Championship was won by Tucumán Rugby Club

Results

Bibliography
  Memorias de la UAR 1945
  I Campeonato Argentino

Campeonato Argentino de Rugby
Argentina
Campeonato